The Pilipinas VisMin Super Cup 1st Conference, also known as the Chooks-to-Go Pilipinas VisMin Super Cup due to sponsorship reasons, is the inaugural season of the Pilipinas VisMin Super Cup, a professional basketball league in the Philippines.

Teams
The Pilipinas VisMin Super Cup consists entirely of teams from the Visayas and Mindanao regions of the Philippines. For its first season, the league will have seven teams from the Visayas region, all of which are from Central Visayas.

 Notes

Division tournaments

Visayas leg
All games were held in the Alcantara Civic Center in Alcantara, Cebu.

Elimination round

Team standings

Results

This excludes Siquijor's 105–100 win over Dumaguete, 46–66 loss against Mandaue City, and a game against Lapu-Lapu City that was halted in halftime with them trailing 13–27.

Playoffs

Quarterfinals

All of these are single-elimination games.

Semifinals
KCS Computer Specialist Mandaue City possesses the twice-to-beat advantage.

Finals
This is a best-of-three playoff.

{{basketballbox|bg=#eee |date=May 9 |place=Alcantara Civic Center, Alcantara, Cebu
|teamA=MJAS Zenith Talisay City Aquastars |scoreA=75
|teamB=KCS Computer Specialist Mandaue City |scoreB=89|series=Mandaue City wins series 2–1, and qualifies to the Grand Finals
}}Finals MVP: Chris Exciminiano (Mandaue City)

Mindanao leg
Games prior to July 17, are held in the Ipil Provincial Gym, Ipil, Zamboanga Sibugay. Games scheduled on July 17 onwards, are to be held in thePlaza Luz Gym in Pagadian, Zamboanga del Sur.

Elimination round
Team standings

Results

Playoffs

Southern Finals

 Awards 

 Most Valuable Player: Hesed Gabo (Jumbo Plastic-Basilan Peace Riders)

 Mythical Five: Hesed Gabo (Jumbo Plastic-Basilan Peace Riders)
 Michael Mabulac (Jumbo Plastic-Basilan Peace Riders)
 John Wilson (Clarin Sto. Niño)
 Jerwin Gaco (Zamboanga City JPS)
 James Castro (Petra Cement-Roxas Vanguards)
 Top Homegrown Player:''' Rich Guinitaran

Controversy

The game between the ARQ Builders-Lapu Lapu City Heroes and the Siquijor Mystics was stopped at the half with Lapu Lapu leading, 27–13, ostensibly due to a power interruption. However, it was reported afterward that the game was stopped by officials after suspicious actions by the players—including missed free throws and blown layups. One video circulating online showed a player take a free throw first with his left hand, then with his right. Pilipinas VisMin Super Cup organizers expelled the Siquijor Mystics from the league. Fines and suspensions were also slapped against players and coaches of the Lapu-Lapu Heroes for their role in the controversial match.

References

2020–21 in Philippine basketball leagues
Pilipinas VisMin Super Cup